Napolioni is both an Italian surname and a given name. Notable people with the name include:

Antonio Napolioni (born 1957), Italian Roman Catholic bishop
Marco Napolioni (born 1975), Italian footballer
Napolioni Bolaca (born 1996), Fijian rugby union player
Napolioni Nalaga (born 1986), Fijian rugby union player
Napolioni Qasevakatini (born 1993), Fijian footballer

Italian-language surnames